The  was a class of two torpedo boat destroyers (TBDs) of the Imperial Japanese Navy, built in Britain in 1901-02.

Background
The Akatsuki-class destroyers were ordered under the 1897 fiscal budget as a follow-on to the earlier . Both were ordered on 5 November 1900 from Yarrow & Co, and built at their London Yard, Cubitt Town, London.

Design
Substantially identical to the previous Ikazuchi class, the main difference between the vessels was in the design of its rudder. With the previous class, the rudder was semi-balanced, and had a portion exposed above the waterline. This made the vessel vulnerable to disablement by stray gunfire. The Akatsuki class was intended to remedy this design flaw. Only two vessels were procured, as the Japanese navy intended to study the technique and to retrofit the existing Ikazuchi-class vessels in Japan.

The design was similar to the four-stack Royal Navy , also known as the "Thirty Knotters".

Both vessels had a flush deck design with a distinctive "turtleback" forecastle that was intended to clear water from the bow during high speed navigation, but was poorly designed for high waves or bad weather. The bridge and forward gun platform were barely raised above the bow, resulting in a wet conning position. More than half of the small hull was occupied by the boilers and the engine room. With fuel and weaponry, there was little space left for crew quarters.

Both were powered by triple expansion steam engines and had coal-fired water-tube boilers. Armament was one QF 12-pounder gun on a bandstand on the forecastle, five QF 6 pounder Hotchkiss guns (two sited abreast the conning tower, two sited between the funnels and one on the quarterdeck) and 2 single tubes for  torpedoes.

Operational history
Both Akatsuki-class destroyers arrived in Japan in time to be used in combat service during the Russo-Japanese War of 1904-1905. Akatsuki arrived at Yokosuka on 7 May 1902 and Kasumi on 25 June.

After the end of the Russo-Japanese War, Kasumi was re-classified as third-class destroyer on 28 August 1912 and was removed from front line combat service. The ship was used as an unarmed utility vessel until 1920.

List of ships

References

Notes

Books
Cocker, Maurice (1983). Destroyers of the Royal Navy, 1893-1981. Ian Allan.  .

Lyon, David (1996).  The First Destroyers.  Naval Institute Press, Annapolis, Maryland. .

External links

Destroyer classes
 
Russo-Japanese War naval ships of Japan